Josip Zemko (13 March 1946 — 11 April 2017) was a former Yugoslav football manager and player.

He was one of the best Yugoslav defenders in the 1960s. In 1963, he started playing for the first team and very soon he became a candidate for the Yugoslav national team. He had collected three caps before he broke a leg in 1966. He never managed to reach the same level of play he was showing before the injury.

After having coached several clubs in Serbia, he was coaching youth teams at FK Bačka 1901.

External links

Player profile on Serbian National Team page
Profile and career story at FK Bačka 1901 official website.

Yugoslav footballers
Yugoslavia international footballers
Serbian footballers
FK Željezničar Sarajevo players
FK Vojvodina players
FK Spartak Subotica players
Yugoslav First League players
1946 births
Living people
Sportspeople from Subotica
Yugoslav football managers
Croatian football managers
Serbian football managers
Association football defenders
Croats of Vojvodina
FK Bačka 1901 managers